Barbora Závadová (born 23 January 1993) is a Czech swimmer from Ostrava.

At the 2011 FINA World Championships, she swam to new Czech Records in the 200 and 400 Individual Medleys (2:14.03 and 4:36.96).

References 
 
 

1993 births
Living people
Sportspeople from Ostrava
Czech female swimmers
Swimmers at the 2010 Summer Youth Olympics
Swimmers at the 2012 Summer Olympics
Swimmers at the 2016 Summer Olympics
Olympic swimmers of the Czech Republic
European Aquatics Championships medalists in swimming
Universiade medalists in swimming
Universiade silver medalists for the Czech Republic
Female medley swimmers
Medalists at the 2015 Summer Universiade